The Case of the Velvet Claws is a 1936 mystery film, based on the first Perry Mason novel (1933) by Erle Stanley Gardner and featuring the fourth and final appearance of Warren William as defense attorney Mason.

Plot summary

Mason finally marries his longtime secretary Della Street, but has to cut their honeymoon short in order to defend a woman accused of murder.

Cast
 Warren William as Perry Mason
 Claire Dodd as Della Street Mason
 Wini Shaw as Eva Belter (as Winifred Shaw)
 Bill Elliott as Carl Griffin (as Gordon Elliott)
 Joe King as George C. Belter (as Joseph King)
 Addison Richards as Frank Locke
 Eddie Acuff as Spudsy Drake
 Olin Howland as Wilbur Strong
 Dick Purcell as Crandal
 Kenneth Harlan as Peter Milnor
 Clara Blandick as Judge Mary F. O'Daugherty

Home media
On October 23, 2012, Warner Home Video released the film on DVD in Region 1 via their Warner Archive Collection alongside The Case of the Howling Dog, The Case of the Curious Bride, The Case of the Lucky Legs, The Case of the Black Cat and  The Case of the Stuttering Bishop in a set entitled Perry Mason: The Original Warner Bros. Movies Collection. This is a manufacture-on-demand (MOD) release, available exclusively through Warner's online store and only in the US. The box set can also be purchased through Amazon.com.

References

External links
 
 
 
 

1936 films
American black-and-white films
American mystery films
Warner Bros. films
Films directed by William Clemens
1936 crime films
Films based on American novels
Films based on mystery novels
Perry Mason
1936 mystery films
American crime films
1930s American films
Films scored by Bernhard Kaun
1930s English-language films